Friedrich Heinrich Jacobi (25 January 1743 – 10 March 1819) was an influential German philosopher, literary figure, and socialite.

He is notable for popularizing nihilism, a term coined by Obereit in 1787, and promoting it as the prime fault of Enlightenment thought particularly in the philosophical systems of Baruch Spinoza, Immanuel Kant, Johann Fichte and Friedrich Schelling.

Jacobi advocated Glaube (variously translated as faith or "belief") and revelation instead of speculative reason. In this sense, Jacobi can be seen to have anticipated present-day writers who criticize secular philosophy as relativistic and dangerous for religious faith.

In his time, he was also well known among literary circles for his critique of the Sturm and Drang movement, and implicitly close associate and intimate partner of Johann Wolfgang von Goethe, and his visions of atomized individualism. His literary projects were devoted to the reconciliation of Enlightenment individualism with social obligation.

He was the younger brother of poet Johann Georg Jacobi and the father of the great psychiatrist Maximilian Jacobi.

Biography

Early life
He was born at Düsseldorf, the second son of a wealthy sugar merchant, and was educated for a commercial career, which included a brief apprenticeship at a merchant house in Frankfurt-am-Main during 1759. Following, he was sent to Geneva for general education. Jacobi, of a retiring, meditative disposition, associated himself at Geneva mainly with the literary and scientific circle (of which the most prominent member was Le Sage).

He studied  closely the works of Charles Bonnet, as well as the political ideas of Jean-Jacques Rousseau and Voltaire. In 1763 he was recalled to Düsseldorf, and in the following year he married Elisbeth von Clermont and took over the management of his father's business.

After a short time, he gave up his commercial career, and in 1770 he became a member of the council for the duchies of Jülich and Berg.  He distinguished himself by his ability in financial affairs and his zeal in social reform. Jacobi kept up his interest in literary and philosophic matters by an extensive correspondence. His mansion at Pempelfort, near Düsseldorf, was the centre of a distinguished literary circle. He helped to found a new literary journal with Christoph Martin Wieland. Some his earliest writings, mainly on practical or economic subjects, were published in Der Teutsche Merkur.

Here too appeared in part the first of his philosophic works, Edward Allwill's Briefsammlung (1776), a combination of romance and speculation. This was followed in 1779 by Woldemar, a philosophic novel, of very imperfect structure, but full of genial ideas, and giving the most complete picture of Jacobi's method of philosophizing.

In 1779, he visited Munich following his appointment as minister and privy councillor for the Bavarian department of customs and commerce. He opposed the mercantilistic policies of Bavaria and intended to liberalize local customs and taxes; but, after a short stay there, differences with his colleagues and with the authorities of Bavaria, as well as his unwillingness to engage in a power struggle, drove him back to Pempelfort. The experience as well as its aftermath led to the publication of two essays in which Jacobi defended Adam Smith's theories of political economy. These essays were followed in 1785 by the work which first brought Jacobi into prominence as a philosopher.

Pantheism controversy

A conversation with Gotthold Lessing in 1780 in which Lessing avowed that he knew no philosophy in the true sense of that word, save Spinozism, led him to a protracted study of Spinoza's works. After Lessing's death, just a couple of months later, Jacobi continued to engage with Spinozism in an exchange of letters with Lessing's close friend Moses Mendelssohn, which began in 1783. These letters, published with commentary by Jacobi as Briefe über die Lehre Spinozas (1785; 2nd ed., much enlarged and with important Appendices, 1789), expressed sharply and clearly Jacobi's strenuous objection to a dogmatic system in philosophy, and drew upon him the vigorous enmity of the Aufklärer.

Jacobi was ridiculed for trying to reintroduce into philosophy the antiquated notion of unreasoning belief, was denounced as an enemy of reason, as a pietist, and as a Jesuit in disguise, and was especially attacked for his use of the ambiguous term "belief". His next important work, David Hume über den Glauben, oder Idealismus und Realismus (1787), was an attempt to show not only that the term Glaube had been used by the most eminent writers to denote what he had employed it for in the Letters on Spinoza, but that the nature of the cognition of facts as opposed to the construction of inferences could not be otherwise expressed. In this writing, and especially in the Appendix, Jacobi came into contact with the critical philosophy, and subjected the Kantian view of knowledge to searching examination.

In 1787, Friedrich Heinrich Jacobi addressed, in his book On Faith, or Idealism and Realism, Kant's concept of "thing-in-itself." Jacobi agreed that the objective thing-in-itself cannot be directly known. However, he stated, it must be taken on faith. A subject must believe that there is a real object in the external world that is related to the representation or mental idea that is directly known. This faith or belief is a result of revelation or immediately known, but logically unproved, truth. The real existence of a thing-in-itself is revealed or disclosed to the observing subject. In this way, the subject directly knows the ideal, subjective representations that appear in the mind, and strongly believes in the real, objective thing-in-itself that exists outside of the mind. By presenting the external world as an object of faith, Jacobi legitimized belief and its theological associations. Schopenhauer would later state: "…[B]y reducing the external world to a matter of faith, he wanted merely to open a little door for faith in general…."

Ironically, the Pantheism Controversy led later German philosophers and writers to take an interest in pantheism and Spinozism. Jacobi's fideism remained unpopular, and instead his critique of Enlightenment rationalism led more German philosophers to explore atheism and wrestle with the perceived loss of philosophical foundations for theism, myth, and morality. Jacobi and the Pantheism Controversy he ignited remain important in European intellectual history, because he formulated (albeit critically) one of the first systematic statements of nihilism and represents an early example of the death of God discourse.

Later life
The Pempelfort era came to an end in 1794 when the French Revolution spilled over into Germany following the outbreak of war with the French Republic. The occupation of Düsseldorf by French Troops forced him to resettle and for nearly ten years live in Holstein. There he became intimately acquainted with Karl Leonhard Reinhold (in whose Beitrage his important work, Uber das Unternehmen des Kriticismus, die Vernunft zu Verstande zu bringen, was first published), and with Matthias Claudius, the editor of the Wandsbecker Bote.

Atheism dispute 

Gottlieb Fichte was dismissed from Jena in 1799 as a result of a charge of atheism. He was accused of this in 1798, after publishing his essay "Ueber den Grund unsers Glaubens an eine göttliche Weltregierung" ("On the Ground of Our Belief in a Divine World-Governance"), which he had written in response to Friedrich Karl Forberg's essay "Development of the Concept of Religion", in his Philosophical Journal. For Fichte, God should be conceived primarily in moral terms: "The living and efficaciously acting moral order is itself God. We require no other God, nor can we grasp any other" ("On the Ground of Our Belief in a Divine World-Governance"). Fichte's intemperate "Appeal to the Public" ("Appellation an das Publikum", 1799) as well as a more thoughtful response entitled “From a Private Letter” (1799), provoked F. H. Jacobi to publish Letter to Fichte (1799), in which he equated philosophy in general and Fichte's transcendental philosophy in particular with nihilism and the relation of his own philosophic principles to theology.

President of Academy of sciences and retirement 
Soon after his return to Germany, Jacobi received a call to Munich in connection with the new academy of sciences just founded there. The loss of a considerable portion of his fortune induced him to accept this offer; he settled in Munich in 1804, and in 1807 became president of the academy.

In 1811 appeared his last philosophic work, directed against Friedrich Schelling specially (Von den göttlichen Dingen und ihrer Offenbarung), the first part of which, a review of the Wandsbecker Bote, had been written in 1798. A bitter reply from Schelling was left without answer by Jacobi, but gave rise to an animated controversy in which Fries and Baader took prominent part.

In 1812 Jacobi retired from the office of president, and began to prepare a collected edition of his works. He died before this was completed. The edition of his writings was continued by his friend F. Koppen, and was completed in 1825. The works fill six volumes, of which the fourth is in three parts. To the second is prefixed an introduction by Jacobi, which is at the same time an introduction to his philosophy. The fourth volume has also an important preface.

Philosophical work
Jacobi's philosophy is essentially unsystematic. A fundamental view which underlies all his thinking is brought to bear in succession upon those systematic doctrines which appear to stand most sharply in contradiction to it, and any positive philosophic results are given only occasionally. The leading idea of the whole is that of the complete separation between understanding [comprehension] and apprehension of real fact. For Jacobi, Understanding, or the logical faculty, is purely formal or elaborative, and its results never transcend the given material supplied to it. From the basis of immediate experience or perception thought proceeds by comparison and abstraction, establishing connections among facts, but remaining in its nature mediate and finite.

The principle of reason and consequent, the necessity of thinking each given fact of perception as conditioned, impels understanding towards an endless series of identical propositions, the records of successive comparisons and abstractions. The province of the understanding is therefore strictly the region of the conditioned; to it the world must present itself as a mechanism. If, then, there is objective truth at all, the existence of real facts must be made known to us otherwise than through the logical faculty of thought; and, as the regress from conclusion to premises must depend upon something not itself capable of logical grounding, mediate thought implies the consciousness of immediate truth.

Philosophy therefore must resign the hopeless ideal of a systematic (i.e. intelligible) explanation of things, and must content itself with the examination of the facts of consciousness. It is a mere prejudice of philosophic thinkers, a prejudice which has descended from Aristotle, that mediate or demonstrated cognition is superior in cogency and value to the immediate perception of truths or facts.

As Jacobi starts with the doctrine that thought is partial and limited, applicable only to connect facts, but incapable of explaining their existence, it is evident that for him any demonstrative system of metaphysic which should attempt to subject all existence to the principle of logical ground must be repulsive. Now in modern philosophy the first and greatest demonstrative system of metaphysic is that of Spinoza; it is, therefore, sensible that upon Spinoza's system Jacobi should first direct his criticism. A summary of the results of his examination is thus presented (Werke, i. 216–223):
Spinozism is atheism;
the Kabbalistic philosophy, insofar as it is philosophy, is nothing but undeveloped or confused Spinozism;
the philosophy of Leibniz and Wolff is not less fatalistic than that of Spinoza, and carries a resolute thinker to the very principles of Spinoza;
every demonstrative method ends in fatalism (nihilism);
we can demonstrate only similarities (agreements, truths conditionally necessary), proceeding always in identical propositions; every proof presupposes something already proved, the principle of which is immediately given (Offenbarung, revelation, is the term here employed by Jacobi, as by many later writers, e.g. Lotze, to denote the peculiar character of an immediate, unproved, given truth);
the keystone (Element) of all human knowledge and activity is belief (Glaube, or "faith").

Of these propositions, only the first and fourth require further explanation.

Jacobi, accepting the law of reason and consequent as the fundamental rule of demonstrative reasoning, and as the rule explicitly followed by Spinoza, points out that, if we proceed by applying this principle so as to recede from particular and qualified facts to the more general and abstract conditions, we land ourselves, not in the notion of an active, intelligent creator of the system of things, but in the notion of an all-comprehensive, indeterminate Nature, devoid of will or intelligence. Our unconditioned is either a pure abstraction, or else the impossible notion of a completed system of conditions. In either case the result is atheism, and this result is necessary if the demonstrative method, the method of understanding, is regarded as the only possible means of knowledge.

Moreover, the same method inevitably lands in fatalism/nihilism. For, if the action of the human will is to be made intelligible to understanding, it must be thought as a conditioned phenomenon, having its sufficient ground in preceding circumstances, and, in ultimate abstraction, as the outflow from nature which is the sum of conditions. But this is the fatalist conception, and any philosophy which accepts the law of reason and consequent as the essence of understanding is fatalistic/nihilistic. Thus for the scientific understanding there can be no God and no liberty.

It is impossible that there should be a God, for if so he would of necessity be finite. But a finite God, a God that is known, is no God. It is impossible that there should be liberty, for if so the mechanical order of phenomena, by means of which they are comprehensible, would be disturbed, and we should have an unintelligible world, coupled with the requirement that it shall be understood. Cognition, then, in the strict sense, occupies the middle place between sense perception, which is belief in matters of sense, and reason, which is belief in supersensuous fact.

Works
Early essays in Der Teutsche Merkur. Available online.
Edward Allwill’s Briefsammlung (1781).
Etwas das Lessing gesagt hat (1782). Werke, vol. 2, pp. 325-388.
Über die Lehre des Spinoza in Briefen an den Herrn Moses Mendelssohn (1785). 2nd edition, 1789. NYPL.
Friedrich Heinrich Jacobi wider Mendelssohns Beschuldigungen betreffend die Briefe über die Lehre des Spinoza (1786). Oxford.
David Hume über den Glauben, oder Idealismus und Realismus (1787). University of Lausanne.
Woldemar (1794). 2 volumes. Oxford. 2nd edition, 1796. NYPL.
Jacobi an Fichte (1799). University of Michigan. Text 1799/1816, Italian Translation, 3 Appendices with Jacobi's and Fichte's complementary Texts, Commentary by A. Acerbi): La Scuola di Pitagora, Naples 2017, .
Ueber das Unternehmen des Kriticismus (1801). Werke, vol. 3, pp. 59-195.
Ueber Gelehrte Gesellschaften, ihren Geist und Zweck (1807). Harvard.
Von den göttlichen Dingen und ihrer Offenbarung (1811). University of California.
Friedrich Heinrich Jacobi's Werke (1812–1825).
Volume 1, 1812. Harvard; NYPL; University of Michigan; University of Michigan (Morris).
Volume 2, 1815. Harvard; NYPL; University of Michigan; University of Michigan (Morris).
Volume 3, 1816. Harvard; NYPL; University of Michigan; University of Michigan (Morris).
Volume 4, 1819. Harvard. Parts 1 & 2: Oxford; University of Michigan (Morris).
Part 1. NYPL; University of Michigan.
Part 2. NYPL; University of Michigan.
Part 3. NYPL; University of Michigan (Morris).
Volume 5, 1820. Harvard; NYPL; University of Michigan; University of Michigan (Morris).
Volume 6, 1825. NYPL; University of Michigan (Morris).
Friedrich Heinrich Jacobi's auserlesener Briefwechsel (1825–27). 2 volumes.
Volume 1, 1825. Harvard; University of Michigan.
Volume 2, 1827. Harvard; University of Michigan.

Notes

External links 
 
 
 
 
Friedrich Heinrich Jacobi, George Di Giovanni (1994)."The Main Philosophical Writings and the Novel Allwill". McGill-Queen's Press - MQUP, . .

1743 births
1819 deaths
Writers from Düsseldorf
19th-century German writers
19th-century German male writers
18th-century German novelists
18th-century philosophers
19th-century philosophers
18th-century German philosophers
German Protestants
People from Berg (state)
Members of the Bavarian Academy of Sciences
German male novelists
Spinoza scholars
19th-century German philosophers